was a town located in Kimotsuki District, Kagoshima Prefecture, Japan.

As of 2003, the town had an estimated population of 7,189 and a density of 84.24 persons per km². The total area was 85.34 km².

On March 22, 2005, Ōnejime, along with the town of Tashiro (also from Kimotsuki District), was merged to create the town of Kinkō.

External links
 Official website of Kinko 

Dissolved municipalities of Kagoshima Prefecture
Populated places disestablished in 2005
2005 disestablishments in Japan